is a railway station in Oshamambe, Hokkaidō, Japan, operated by the Hokkaido Railway Company (JR Hokkaido).

Lines
Hakodate Main Line Station H48

Surroundings
  Route 5
 Hakodate Bus "Nakanosawa Eki-mae" Bus Stop

Adjacent stations

Railway stations in Japan opened in 1904
Railway stations in Hokkaido Prefecture